This list of Mac models grouped by CPU type contains all central processing units (CPUs) used by Apple Inc. for their Mac computers. It is grouped by processor family, processor model, and then chronologically by Mac models.

Motorola 68k

Motorola 68000 

The Motorola 68000 was the first Apple Macintosh processor. It has 32-bit CPU registers, a 24-bit address bus, and a 16-bit data path; Motorola referred to it as a "16-/32-bit microprocessor."

Motorola 68020 

The Motorola 68020 was the first 32-bit Mac processor, first used on the Macintosh II. The 68020 has many improvements over the 68000, including an instruction cache, and was the first Mac processor to support a paged memory management unit, the Motorola 68851.

The Macintosh LC configured the 68020 to use a 16-bit system bus with ASICs that limited RAM to 10 MB (as opposed to the 32-bit limit of 4 GB).

Motorola 68030 

The Motorola 68030 was the first Mac processor with an integrated paged memory management unit, allowing for virtual memory. Another improvement over the 68020 was the addition of a data cache.

Motorola 68040 

The Motorola 68040 has improved per-clock performance compared to the 68030, as well as larger instruction and data caches, and was the first Mac processor with an integrated floating-point unit.

The MC68LC040 version was less expensive because it omitted the floating-point unit.

PowerPC

PowerPC 601 

The PowerPC 601 was the first Mac processor to support the 32-bit PowerPC instruction set architecture.

PowerPC 603

PowerPC 604 

The PowerPC 604e was the first Mac processor available in a symmetric multiprocessing (SMP) configuration.

PowerPC G3

PowerPC G4 

The PowerPC 7400 was the first Mac processor to include an AltiVec vector processing unit.

The PowerPC 7455 was the first Mac processor over 1 GHz.

PowerPC G5 

The PowerPC 970 ("G5") was the first 64-bit Mac processor.

The PowerPC 970MP was the first dual-core Mac processor and the first to be found in a quad-core configuration. It was also the first Mac processor with partitioning and virtualization capabilities.

Apple only used three variants of the G5, and soon moved entirely onto Intel architecture.

Intel x86 
Sources:  and

Overview

P6 
Yonah was the first Mac processor to support the IA-32 instruction set architecture, in addition to the MMX, SSE, SSE2, and SSE3 extension instruction sets.

The Core Solo was a Core Duo with one of the two cores disabled.

Core 
Woodcrest added support for the SSSE3 instruction set.

Merom was the first Mac processor to support the x86-64 instruction set, as well as the first 64-bit processor to appear in a Mac notebook.

Clovertown was the first quad-core Mac processor and the first to be found in an 8-core configuration.

Penryn 

Penryn added support for a subset for SSE4 (SSE4.1).

Nehalem 

Bloomfield and Gainestown introduced a number of notable features for the first time in any Mac processors:

Integrated memory controllers (with on-die DMI or QPI).
Simultaneous multithreading (branded as Hyper-threading).
Full support for the SSE4 instruction set (SSE4.2).
Support for Intel Turbo Boost.
Four cores on a single die rather than a multi-chip module of two dual-core dies.

Westmere 
Arrandale introduced Intel HD Graphics, an on-die integrated GPU.

Sandy Bridge 

Sandy Bridge added support for Intel Quick Sync Video, a dedicated on-die video encoding and decoding core. It was also the first quad-core processor to appear in a Mac notebook.

Ivy Bridge

Haswell 
The Crystal Well variant used in some MacBook Pros contains an on-package L4 cache shared between the CPU and integrated graphics.

Broadwell

Skylake

Kaby Lake

Coffee Lake 

Coffee Lake was the first 6-core processor to appear in a Mac notebook.

Cascade Lake

Comet Lake

Ice Lake 

Ice Lake (Sunny Cove) is a 10th generation chip.

Apple silicon 

Source:

M1 

The M1 is a system on a chip fabricated by TSMC on the 5 nm process and contains 16 billion transistors. Its CPU cores are the first to be used in a Mac processor designed by Apple and the first to use the ARM instruction set architecture. It has 8 CPU cores (4 performance and 4 efficiency), up to 8 GPU cores, and a 16-core Neural Engine, as well as LPDDR4X memory with a bandwidth of 68 GB/s. The M1 Pro and M1 Max SoCs are fabricated by TSMC on the 5 nm process and contain 33.7 and 57 billion transistors respectively. Both have 10 CPU cores (8 performance and 2 efficiency) and a 16-core Neural Engine.

The M1 Pro and M1 Max have a 16-core and 32-core GPU, and a 256-bit and 512-bit LPDDR5 memory bus supporting 200 and 400 GB/s bandwidth respectively. Both chips were first introduced in the MacBook Pro in October 2021.

On March 8, 2022, the M1 Ultra, a processor combining two M1 Max chips in one package, was announced. It is initially available exclusively in the highest-end variants of the Mac Studio and was released simultaneously with on March 18, 2022. All parameters of the M1 Max processors are doubled in M1 Ultra processors, as they are essentially two M1 Max chips operating in parallel; they are, however, packed as one processor package (in size being bigger than Socket AM4 AMD Ryzen processor) and seen as one M1 Ultra processor in macOS.

M2 

The M2 is a system on a chip fabricated by TSMC on an enhanced 5 nm process, containing 20 billion transistors. It has 8 CPU cores (4 performance and 4 efficiency), up to 10 GPU cores, and a 16 core Neural Engine, as well as LPDDR5 memory with a bandwidth of 100 GB/s. The M2 Pro and M2 Max SoCs are fabricated by TSMC on an enhanced 5 nm process and contain 40 and 67 billion transistors respectively. Both have 12 CPU cores (8 performance and 4 efficiency) and a 16-core Neural Engine.

The M2 Pro and M2 Max have a 19-core and 38-core GPU, and a 256-bit and 512-bit LPDDR5 memory bus supporting 200 and 400 GB/s bandwidth respectively. Both chips were first introduced in the MacBook Pro in January 2023.

See also 
 Mac (computer)
 List of Mac models

Notes

References

Sources 
 Specifications, Apple, Inc.
 Ian Page and contributors, MacTracker.
 Glen Sanford, Apple History, apple-history.com.
 Dan Knight, Computer Profiles, LowEndMac, Cobweb Publishing, Inc.
 Product Specifications, Intel, Inc.

CPU
 
Apple Macintosh CPU
Macintosh models grouped by CPU type